The 2012 United States Senate election in Virginia took place on November 6, 2012, concurrently with the 2012 U.S. presidential election as well as other elections to the United States Senate and House of Representatives and various state and local elections. Incumbent Democratic U.S. Senator Jim Webb retired instead of running for reelection to a second term, and former Democratic Governor of Virginia Tim Kaine won the open seat over Republican former Senator and Governor George Allen. Kaine was unopposed for the Democratic nomination, and the Republicans nominated Allen through a primary on June 12, 2012.  Allen had previously held this seat for one term before narrowly losing reelection to Webb in 2006.

Republican primary 
In Virginia, parties have the option of whether to hold a primary or to nominate their candidate through a party convention.  In November 2010, the Virginia GOP announced that it had chosen to hold a primary.

Candidates

Declared 
 George Allen, former U.S. Senator and former Governor of Virginia
 E. W. Jackson, minister and conservative activist
 Bob Marshall, State Delegate and candidate in 2008
 Jamie Radtke, conservative activist

Withdrawn 
 Tim Donner, founder of Horizons Television and LibertyNation.com
 David McCormick, attorney

Declined 
 Liz Cheney, former Principal Deputy Assistant Secretary of State for Near Eastern Affairs
 Ken Cuccinelli, Virginia Attorney General
 Tom Davis, former U.S. Representative
 Corey Stewart, Prince William County Board of Supervisors Chairman

Debates 
Three debates between Republican candidates were announced before the primary on June 12, 2012. The debates took place in Richmond, Northern Virginia, and Hampton Roads.

Polling

Endorsements

Results

Hank the Cat
On February 27, 2012, a Maine Coon cat named Hank the Cat was announced to be running a write-in campaign as a joke candidate. His campaign gained national attention worldwide and was a success, as Hank placed third with 6,832 votes. In addition to receiving nearly seven thousand votes, Hank's campaign also raised $16,000 for animal charities throughout the world.

General election

Candidates 
 George Allen (Republican), former U.S. Senator and former Governor of Virginia
 Tim Kaine (Democrat), former Governor of Virginia and former Democratic National Committee chairman
Only Allen and Kaine qualified for the ballot.

Debates 
David Gregory moderated a debate between Kaine and Allen on September 20, 2012. Topics included partisan gridlock in Washington policy making, job creation, tax policy, and Middle East unrest.

External links
Complete video of debate, September 20, 2012 - C-SPAN
Complete video of debate, October 8, 2012 - C-SPAN
Complete video of debate, October 18, 2012 - C-SPAN

Campaign 
Once incumbent U.S. Senator Jim Webb decided to retire, many Democratic candidates were speculated. These included U.S. Congressmen Rick Boucher, Gerry Connolly, Glenn Nye, Tom Perriello and Bobby Scott. However, they all declined and encouraged Kaine to run for the seat, believing he would be by far the most electable candidate. Courtney Lynch, former Marine Corps Officer and Fairfax business consultant and Julien Modica, former CEO of the Brain Trauma Recovery & Policy Institute, eventually withdrew from the election, allowing Kaine to be unopposed in the Democratic primary.

Fundraising

Top contributors

Top industries

Independent expenditures 
In early October 2012, Crossroads GPS announced it would launch a $16 million advertising buy in national races, of which four were this and three other Senate elections.

Predictions

Polling 

Democratic primary

General election

with Rick Boucher

with Tom Perriello

with Bobby Scott

with Jim Webb

Results

See also 
 Hank the Cat
 2012 United States Senate elections
 2012 United States House of Representatives elections in Virginia

References

External links 
 Virginia State Board of Elections
 Campaign contributions at OpenSecrets.org
 Outside spending at Sunlight Foundation
 Candidate issue positions at On the Issues

Official campaign websites
 George Allen for U.S. Senate
 Tim Kaine for U.S. Senate

2012
Virginia
United States Senate
Tim Kaine